Chatham is a town in Barnstable County, Massachusetts, United States. Chatham is located at the southeast tip of Cape Cod and has historically been a fishing community. First settled by the English in 1664, the township was originally called Monomoit based on the indigenous population's term for the region.  Chatham was incorporated as a town on June 11, 1712, and has become a summer resort area. The population was 6,594 at the 2020 census, and can swell to 25,000 during the summer months. There are four villages that comprise the town, those being Chatham (CDC), South Chatham, North Chatham, and West Chatham. Chatham is home to the Monomoy National Wildlife Refuge, and the decommissioned Monomoy Point Light both located on Monomoy Island. A popular attraction is the Chatham Light, which is an operational lighthouse that is operated by the United States Coast Guard.

History
Native American tribes who lived in the area before European colonization included the Nauset, specifically the Manomoy or Monomoy people. The expansive lands over which they roamed were known to them as Manamoyik or Monomoit. Explorer Samuel de Champlain landed here in October 1606 at a place he christened "Port Fortuné", where he contacted (and skirmished with) the Nauset. Twelve years later another group of Europeans gave it the name "Sutcliffe's Inlets". Neither name stuck, and the location was not permanently occupied by Europeans until English settlers reached Monomoit in 1664. The town was incorporated on June 11, 1712, at which point it was renamed after Chatham, Kent, England. Its territory expanded with the annexation of Strong Island and its vicinity on February 7, 1797.

Located at the "elbow" of Cape Cod, the community became a shipping, fishing, and whaling center. Chatham's early prosperity would leave it with a considerable number of 18th century buildings, whose charm helped it develop into a popular summer resort.

Chatham is home to the Chatham Lighthouse, which was established by President Thomas Jefferson in 1808 to protect the ships circling the Cape. The 1808 towers were replaced in 1841 by twin brick towers that were eventually lost to erosion. The pair were rebuilt in 1877 out of cast iron across the street from its original location, where the light is today. The northern of the two was moved to Eastham to become the Nauset Light in 1923, when the northern tower was declared surplus. Today, the keeper's house is home to a Coast Guard station which patrols the waters of the Atlantic and Nantucket Sound from Wellfleet to West Yarmouth.  The first reforesting project in America took place on Great Hill in 1821 when Selectmen had pine trees and beach grass planted to prevent erosion and to keep sand from blowing over the village.

Although urban sprawl has invaded the Cape, the town of Chatham still boasts a quaint and walkable Main Street, home to numerous family-owned and -operated shops, restaurants, and businesses. The main shopping area features pedestrian-friendly crosswalks, on-street parallel parking, and some parking lots that are off Main Street. During the summer, concerts are held in a gazebo on Main Street, and not far from the shops is where the Chatham Anglers baseball team plays, as part of the Cape Cod Baseball League on the peninsula for collegiate-age players.

Chatham, like much of Cape Cod, is suffering from an exodus of young people and young families due to high housing prices and a lack of social and professional opportunities. The majority of homes in Chatham sit empty in the winter months until the summer when second-home owners come to use their summer/vacation homes, or they are used as weekly rentals for tourists. As of February 22, 2012, the average listing price for a home in Chatham was $1.3 million.

In summer, Chatham grows to a population of an estimated 30,000. Facilities are overcrowded, and there continues to be limited parking in the Main Street Business District. Beaches are affected by this increase of population. Limited parking exists in established parking areas, and the town's most popular beach, Lighthouse Beach, has only off the street parking, which sometimes involves a long walk to her sandy shores.

Historical sites and museums

 Atwood House (1752)
 Caleb Nickerson House (1772)
 Chatham Railroad Museum (1887)
 Josiah Mayo House
 Chatham Marconi Maritime Center (1914)
 Chatham Windmill (1797)
 Chatham Lighthouse (1808)

Geography

The town occupies the southeast corner (the "elbow") of Cape Cod. The town's villages include Chatham proper, Chatham Port, North Chatham, West Chatham, and South Chatham (west of West Chatham). Chatham is bordered by Harwich to the west, Pleasant Bay and Orleans to the north, the Atlantic Ocean to the east, and Nantucket Sound to the south.

The mainland portion of the town is typical of Cape Cod, with several ponds, brooks, rivers, harbors, and inlets around the town.  The town includes two narrow strips of land which serve as a barrier between the Atlantic and the mainland; the northern of these is the southern part of the Cape Cod National Seashore.  There are several islands, including Strong Island, Tern Island (which is a sanctuary), Morris Island, Stage Island, and Monomoy Island, a  island south of the corner of the town which is home to the Monomoy National Wildlife Refuge.  Erosion has changed the region over the years—for example, an island named Slut's Bush once existed until it vanished under water by the mid 19th century.

Climate

According to the Köppen climate classification system, Chatham, Massachusetts has a warm-summer, wet all year, humid continental climate (Dfb). Dfb climates are characterized by at least one month having an average mean temperature ≤ 32.0 °F (≤ 0.0 °C), at least four months with an average mean temperature ≥ 50.0 °F (≥ 10.0 °C), all months with an average mean temperature ≤ 71.6 °F (≤ 22.0 °C), and no significant precipitation difference between seasons. The average seasonal (Nov-Apr) snowfall total is around 30 in (76 cm). The average snowiest month is February which corresponds with the annual peak in nor'easter activity. The plant hardiness zone is 7b with an average annual extreme minimum air temperature of 5.2 °F (–14.9 °C).

Ecology

The area surrounding Chatham is home to diverse flora and fauna, including many species that rely on the wetlands for survival. The salt marshes and lakes that exist in the region due to glacial action from the last ice age are essential habitats for many species, such as ospreys (Pandion haliaetus) and striped bass (Morone saxatilis). These wetlands not only promote biodiversity, but also act as natural filters, retaining particulates and purifying the water that flows into nearby estuaries and bays. However, Chatham's beaches have experienced significant vegetation loss in recent decades due to both natural and human causes. Despite this, the beaches remain important nesting sites for various species of sea turtles and shorebirds, such as the Piping Plover (Charadrius melodus), while the waters off the coast are rich in marine life, including seals (Halichoerus grypus), whales, and sharks, such as the great white shark (Carcharodon carcharias). In fact, the prevalence of sharks in the waters surrounding Chatham has resulted in its reputation as a hub of great white activity and shark attacks. To help protect and preserve the local flora and fauna, several conservation areas and nature preserves have been established in Chatham, including Monomoy Island, which provides an important breeding ground for the Piping Plover.

According to the A. W. Kuchler U.S. Potential natural vegetation Types, Chatham, Massachusetts would primarily contain a Northeastern Oak/Pine (110) vegetation type with a Southern Mixed Forest (26) vegetation form.

Transportation
All five roads that exit Chatham cross into Harwich. The two state routes that pass through the town are Route 28 and the southern end of Route 137. Route 28 circles through the center of town before exiting and heading north toward Route 6A, joining that route until the roads end at the Orleans Rotary.

Rail service no longer extends to the town; the former rail bed is a bicycling path, and is called the Old Colony Rail Trail.  In addition, another bicycle route passes through the town, starting at the end of the Rail Trail, and providing views of Chatham Fish Pier, Chatham Bars, and Chatham Light.

The town is the home to the Chatham Municipal Airport, which provides local service to other small airports on the Cape and islands. The nearest national and international air service can be reached at Logan International Airport in Boston.

Demographics

As of the census of 2000, there were 6,625 people, 3,160 households, and 1,886 families residing in the town. The racial makeup of the town was 96% White, 1.9% Black or African American, 0.2% Native American, 0.3% Asian, <0.1% Pacific Islander, 0.9% from other races, and 0.8% from two or more races. Hispanic or Latino of any race were 1.0% of the population.

During the summer months (generally Memorial Day through Labor Day), the population of the town triples to approximately 20,000, not counting the additional transient tourist population hosted by the town's many hotels, inns, motels, and bed and breakfasts.  Tourism and Hospitality along with Commercial Fishing make up the town's main industry. The town has a thriving commercial fish pier where day-boats unload fresh fish and lobster.

There were 3,160 households, out of which 15.3% had children under the age of 18 living with them, 51.2% were married couples living together, 6.0% had a female householder with no husband present, and 40.3% were non-families. 34.7% of all households were made up of individuals, and 18.8% had someone living alone who was 65 years of age or older.  The average household size was 2.00 and the average family size was 2.52.

In the town, the population was spread out, with 13.3% under the age of 18, 4.4% from 18 to 24, 19.8% from 25 to 44, 28.2% from 45 to 64, and 34.3% who were 65 years of age or older.  The median age was 54 years. For every 100 females, there were 89.3 males.  For every 100 females age 18 and over, there were 85.4 males.

The local K–12 school system has approximately 700 students, making for average high school grade sizes between 30 and 40 students.

The median income for a household in the town was $85,519, and the median income for a family was $112,750. Males had a median income of $71,064 versus $40,365 for females. The per capita income for the town was $48,594.  About 1.9% of families and 4.8% of the population were below the poverty line, including 5.1% of those under age 18 and 3.7% of those age 65 or over.

Government
Chatham is represented in the Massachusetts House of Representatives as a part of the Fourth Barnstable district, which includes (with the exception of Brewster) all the towns east and north of Harwich on the Cape.  The town is represented in the Massachusetts Senate as a part of the Cape and Islands District, which includes all of Cape Cod, Martha's Vineyard, and Nantucket except the towns of Bourne, Falmouth, Sandwich, and a portion of Barnstable.

The Chatham Police Department is the primary law enforcement agency that services the town. The Police Department is staffed for 24-hour patrol and is a member of the Cape Cod Regional Law Enforcement Council. The Police station was recently constructed in 2012, and is located on George Ryder Road, across the street from the Chatham Municipal Airport. Troopers from the Massachusetts State Police Troop D Yarmouth barracks provide secondary law enforcement services to the town.

The Chatham Fire/Rescue Department is a 24-hour, fully staffed fire department, that provides fire and medical services to the town. The new fire station was constructed in 2016, and is located on Depot Road, across the street from Veteran's Field. Prior to 2012, the fire and police stations were attached and sat on the Depot Road site. The Chatham Fire/Rescue Department also has an unmanned substation on Route 28 in South Chatham; this station houses one engine truck.

On the national level, Chatham is a part of Massachusetts's 9th congressional district and is represented by William R. Keating.  The state's senior (Class II) member of the United States Senate, elected in 2012, is Elizabeth Warren. The junior (Class I) senator is Ed Markey.

Chatham is governed by the open town meeting form of government, administered by an elected Board of Selectmen and an appointed Town Manager. The town has four post offices, all located at various points along Route 28. The town is home to the Eldredge Public Library, named for its benefactor and designed by a student of H. H. Richardson. The town operates several piers, beaches, boat landings and recreation areas throughout town. The nearest hospital is Cape Cod Hospital in Hyannis.

Education
Until 2013, Chatham operated its own school system for the town's 700 students. The Chatham Elementary School served students from pre-kindergarten through fourth grade, the Chatham Middle School served students from fifth through eighth grade, and Chatham High School served grades nine through twelve. Chatham's athletics teams were known as the Blue Devils, and wore blue and white. In December 2010, Chatham and the neighboring town of Harwich voted to regionalize their school systems into the Monomoy Regional school system. The Monomoy teams are known as the Sharks and their colors are navy blue and sliver. In March 2013, construction began in Harwich on a new high school to serve the region, expected to open in 2014. High school students may attend Cape Cod Regional Technical School in Harwich free of charge. Other private schools are located in nearby Brewster and Harwich.

Sports 
The Chatham A's are the local baseball team that competes in the Cape Cod Baseball League. The play at Veteran's Field and have participated in the league since 1923.

Eastward Ho! Golf Course is a notable golf course in town. The course hosted a PGA Tour event, The Cape Cod Open, in the 1930s.

Notable people

 Zered Bassett, pro skateboarder, grew up in Chatham
 Shirley Booth, actress
 Ruby Braff, musician, died in Chatham
 Louis Brandeis, Supreme Court Justice
 Harry Connick, Jr., actor and singer 
 Bernard Cornwell, best-selling author
 Franklin Cover, late actor
 David Drumm, former CEO of Anglo Irish Bank
 Todd Eldredge, champion figure skater
 Jack Forrester, Scottish-American professional golfer 
 Lisa Genova, best-selling author
 Bobby Hackett, musician
 Julie Harris, actress
 Gilbert Knapp, Wisconsin State Assemblyman
 Joseph C. Lincoln, author of Cape Cod Stories
 Joseph Lord, Puritan pastor
 Martha MacCallum, talk show host
 Sara Pennypacker, children's book author
 Bill Richardson, American politician, author, and diplomat
 Christopher Seufert, film director/photographer
 Archelaus Smith, Nova Scotia pioneer
 Bob Staake, cartoonist & illustrator
 Tisquantum (Squanto), died in Chatham and is buried in an unmarked grave on Burial Hill, overlooking Ryder's Cove
 Stuart Varney, talk show host
 Bernard C. Webber, heroic Coast Guardsman who was award the Gold Lifesaving Medal for leading a rescue to the SS Pendleton in 1952

Gallery

References

External links

 Town of Chatham official website

 
1664 establishments in Massachusetts
Populated coastal places in Massachusetts
Populated places established in 1664
Towns in Barnstable County, Massachusetts
Towns in Massachusetts